Anders Nielsen (born 28 September 1986) is a Danish footballer who plays for Swedish side Husqvarna FF.

Career
Nielsen has a past as a winger which is evident in his defensive game. He is quick, good on the ball and is offensively set. He played as a centre back in Næstved BK, but was brought to AGF to play in the full back position. His debut for AGF was on his 23rd birthday, against Esbjerg fB, which they lost 3–2. Not being able to become a regular starter for AGF in the Danish First Division, he was sent on an 11-month loan to SønderjyskE on 11 August 2010, to get his debut only three days later for the club in the Danish Superliga, playing from start at home in a 1-3 loss against Odense BK.

On 30 January 2012, Nielsen was signed by HB Køge after training with the team for a month.

References

External links
AGF profile
Official Danish Superliga stats

1986 births
Living people
Danish men's footballers
Danish expatriate men's footballers
Danish Superliga players
Eerste Divisie players
Superettan players
Køge Boldklub players
Næstved Boldklub players
Aarhus Gymnastikforening players
SønderjyskE Fodbold players
HB Køge players
TOP Oss players
FC Roskilde players
Husqvarna FF players
Expatriate footballers in the Netherlands
Expatriate footballers in Sweden
Association football defenders